Yurtsovo is a rural locality (a village) in Karinskoye Rural Settlement, Alexandrovsky District, Vladimir Oblast, Russia. The population was 21 as of 2010. There is 1 street.

Geography 
Yurtsovo is located on the Molokcha River, 16 km south of Alexandrov (the district's administrative centre) by road. Makhra is the nearest rural locality.

References 

Rural localities in Alexandrovsky District, Vladimir Oblast